The Moncton station is a railway and bus station in Moncton, New Brunswick, Canada. It serves Via Rail's Ocean passenger train and Maritime Bus intercity buses. It is located at 1240 Main Street (New Brunswick Route 106) beside Avenir Centre.

References

External links

 Via Rail page for the Ocean

Via Rail stations in New Brunswick
Buildings and structures in Moncton
Transport in Moncton
Transport in Greater Moncton